Gregg Araki (born December 17, 1959) is an American filmmaker. He is noted for his heavy involvement with the New Queer Cinema movement. His film Kaboom (2010) was the first winner of the Cannes Film Festival Queer Palm.

Early life and education 
Araki was born in Los Angeles on December 17, 1959, to Japanese American parents. He grew up in nearby Santa Barbara, California and enrolled in college at the University of California, Santa Barbara. He graduated with a B.A. from UCSB in 1982. He later attended the University of Southern California's School of Cinematic Arts, where he graduated with a M.F.A. in 1985.

Career

Low-budget beginnings 
Araki made his directorial debut in 1987 with Three Bewildered People in the Night. With a budget of only $5,000 and using a stationary camera, he told the story of a romance between a video artist, her sweet-heart, and her gay friend. Two years later, Araki followed up with The Long Weekend (O' Despair), another film with a $5,000 budget. His third film, The Living End (1992), saw an increase to $20,000. He had to shoot his early movies often spontaneously and lacking proper permits.

Despite the financial constraints, Araki's films received critical acclaim. He received awards from the Locarno International Film Festival and the Los Angeles Film Critics Association, with an additional nomination for a Sundance Film Festival award.

Teenage Apocalypse trilogy 
Araki's next three movies—Totally F***ed Up  (1993), The Doom Generation  (1995), and Nowhere (1997)—were collectively dubbed the Teenage Apocalypse trilogy. The trio has been characterized as "... teen alienation, hazy sexuality and aggression." A former student of his at UC Santa Barbara, Andrea Sperling, co-produced the films with him.

The trilogy saw Araki work increasingly with more notable actors and actresses including Rose McGowan, Margaret Cho, Parker Posey, Guillermo Díaz, Ryan Phillippe, Heather Graham, and Mena Suvari among others.

The trilogy received varying degrees of reviews, from a thumbs down and "zero stars" by Roger Ebert to "Literally the Best Thing Ever" by Rookie, and were eventually heralded as cult classics.

Subsequent efforts 
Araki's following film, Splendor (1999), was both an homage to screwball comedies of the 1940s and 1950s and a response to the controversy surrounding his ongoing relationship (despite Araki self-identifying as gay) with actress Kathleen Robertson. Hailed as the director's most optimistic film to date, it made its premiere at the 1999 Sundance Film Festival.

Araki's next project was the ill-fated MTV production This Is How the World Ends, which was originally planned with a budget of $1.5 million. He viewed it as a chance to reach the masses through MTV's viewership and signed on to do the project despite the budget being cut to $700,000. Araki wrote, directed, and shot the pilot episode, but ultimately MTV decided against the project and the effort never aired.

Following a short hiatus, Araki returned in 2004 with the critically acclaimed Mysterious Skin, based on the 1995 Scott Heim novel of the same name. This marked the first time that Araki worked with someone else's source material.

Araki's next feature was the stoner comedy Smiley Face (2007), featuring Anna Faris, Adam Brody, and John Krasinski, written by Dylan Haggerty. It marked a stark change from the dark, heavy drama of Mysterious Skin, a change purposely planned by Araki. It received very favorable reviews, with some describing it as another of Araki's potential cult classics.

Kaboom marked Araki's tenth film and made its premiere at the 2010 Cannes Film Festival. It was awarded the first ever Queer Palm for its contribution to lesbian, gay, bisexual, and transgender issues.

Araki followed that film with White Bird in a Blizzard (2014), which was given limited release to mixed reviews. Araki returned to television with the 2019 series Now Apocalypse, co-executive produced by Gregory Jacobs and Steven Soderbergh on Starz.

Style 
One consistent feature of Araki's work to date is the presence of music from the shoegazing genre as film soundtracks, first seen on Totally Fucked Up and heavily so on the films Nowhere and Mysterious Skin. Both The Living End and Nowhere owe their titles to this shoegaze influence: The Living End after like-named The Jesus and Mary Chain song and Nowhere after Ride's album entitled Nowhere.

Awards and honors 
In 2010, Kaboom was named the first ever winner of the Cannes Film Festival Queer Palm. Araki has also been honored with the 2006 Filmmaker on the Edge Award at the Provincetown International Film Festival. In 2013, Araki was recognized by the Museum of Arts and Design in New York City with the retrospective God Help Me: Gregg Araki.

Personal life 
Araki has previously self-identified as "a gay Asian American". However, beginning in 1997 he had a relationship with actress Kathleen Robertson that ended in 1999. In a 2014 interview, Araki said that "[I] don’t really identify as anything", adding "[I] probably identify as gay at this point, but [I] have been with women".

Filmography

Film

Television

References

External links 

 
 Young, Beautiful, and F***ed: A conversation with Gregg Araki and other members of The Doom Generation in Bright Lights Film Journal

1959 births
Living people
American film directors of Japanese descent
American writers of Japanese descent
American male screenwriters
American film editors
American cinematographers
American television directors
American television writers
University of California, Santa Barbara alumni
USC School of Cinematic Arts alumni
Film producers from California
LGBT people from California
American LGBT screenwriters
American LGBT people of Asian descent
Film directors from Los Angeles
Screenwriters from California
American male television writers
LGBT film directors
LGBT television directors